The 2015 Atlanta Braves season was the Braves' 19th season of home games at Turner Field, 50th season in Atlanta, and 145th season overall.

Offseason

The Braves offseason began in the final week of the 2014 season.  The Braves were officially eliminated from the postseason contention on Sunday, September 21.  On Monday, the Braves announced the termination of General Manager Frank Wren and appointed John Hart as the interim general manager. The Braves signed Hart to a three-year deal to become the Braves President of Baseball Operations a month later. Hart continued to fill the role of general manager throughout the offseason with much help from assistant general manager John Coppolella.

Offseason additions and subtractions

Season summary

Opening Day

After an offseason filled with many trades and roster movements, the Braves began the season with Julio Teherán as the starting pitcher for the second consecutive year. They took an early lead in the first inning after a Nick Markakis single scored Jace Peterson. Miami tied the game in the third inning, but a late Markakis RBI scoring Eric Young, Jr. was the difference. In the team's first save opportunity since trading closer Craig Kimbrel, newly appointed closer Jason Grilli pitched a perfect inning and the Braves won 2–1.

Regular season
After optimistically winning the first five games of the season, the Braves' early success was short-lived. The team finished April with a 10–12 record. They had a winning record in May (15–13), but struggles within the young roster made quality starts and wins few and far between. A July 11 injury to closer Jason Grilli sealed the fate of the struggling team, lacking the skills necessary for a successful starting rotation. An 8–20 August followed, and after additional movements and trades, the team's starting rotation was virtually unrecognizable from how the season began. Shelby Miller, once thought to be a crucial starting pitcher to the team's success, lost a franchise-record 24 consecutive starts, finishing the season with a 6–17 record after receiving a run support average of 2.38 (ranked tenth worst in MLB history).

The Braves finished the season with a 67–95 record, third-worst in the MLB, ahead of the Cincinnati Reds (64–98) and Philadelphia Phillies (63–99).

Season standings

National League East

National League Wild Card

Record vs. opponents

Game log

|- bgcolor="ccffcc"
| 1 || April 6 || @ Marlins || 2–1 || Teherán (1–0) || Álvarez (0–1) || Grilli (1) || 36,969 || 1–0 || W1
|- bgcolor="ccffcc"
| 2 || April 7 || @ Marlins || 12–2 || Wood (1–0) || Latos (0–1) || — || 17,483 || 2–0 || W2
|- bgcolor="ccffcc"
| 3 || April 8 || @ Marlins || 2–0 || Cunniff (1–0) || Koehler (0–1) || Grilli (2) || 16,127 || 3–0 || W3
|- bgcolor="ccffcc"
| 4 || April 10 || Mets || 5–3 || Johnson (1–0) || Montero (0–1) || Grilli (3) || 46,729 || 4–0 || W4
|- bgcolor="ccffcc"
| 5 || April 11 || Mets || 5–3 || Teherán (2–0) || Gee (0–1) || Johnson (1) || 36,056 || 5–0 ||W5
|- bgcolor="ffbbbb"
| 6 || April 12 || Mets || 3–4 || Colón (2–0) || Jaime (0–1) || Familia (1) || 28,192 || 5–1 || L1
|- bgcolor="ccffcc"
| 7 || April 13 || Marlins || 3–2 || Miller (1–0) || Latos (0–2) || Grilli (4) || 13,417 || 6–1 || W1
|- bgcolor="ffbbbb"
| 8 || April 14 || Marlins || 2–8 || Koehler (1–1) || Cahill (0–1)  || — || 15,765 || 6–2 || L1
|- bgcolor="ffbbbb"
| 9 || April 15 || Marlins || 2–6 || Haren (1–0) || Stults (0–1) || — || 18,342 || 6–3 || L2
|- bgcolor="ccffcc"
| 10 || April 17 || @ Blue Jays || 8–7 || Martin (1–0) || Cecil (0–1) || Grilli (5) || 21,397 || 7–3 || W1
|- bgcolor="ffbbbb"
| 11 || April 18 || @ Blue Jays || 5–6 (10) || Cecil (1–1) || Marimón (0–1) || — || 34,743 || 7–4 || L1
|- bgcolor="ccffcc"
| 12 || April 19 || @ Blue Jays || 5–2 || Miller (2–0) || Norris (1–1) || Grilli (6) || 44,794 || 8–4 || W1
|- bgcolor="ffbbbb"
| 13 || April 21 || @ Mets || 1–7 || Niese (2–0) || Cahill (0–2) || — || 21,033 || 8–5 || L1
|- bgcolor="ffbbbb"
| 14 || April 22 || @ Mets || 2–3 || Carlyle (1–0) || Johnson (1–1) || Familia (7) || 20,971 || 8–6 || L2
|- bgcolor="ffbbbb"
| 15 || April 23 || @ Mets || 3–6 || Colón (4–0) || Teherán (2–1) || Familia (8) || 23,980 || 8–7 || L3
|- bgcolor="ffbbbb"
| 16 || April 24 || @ Phillies || 0–1 || Giles (1–0) || Johnson (1–2) || — || 21,164 || 8–8 || L4
|- bgcolor="ccffcc"
| 17 || April 25 || @ Phillies || 5–2 || Miller (3–0) || Buchanan (0–4) || Grilli (7) || 24,748 || 9–8 || W1
|- bgcolor="ffbbbb"
| 18 || April 26 || @ Phillies || 4–5 || Williams (2–1) || Cahill (0–3) || Papelbon (4) || 28,702 || 9–9 || L1
|- bgcolor="ccffcc"
| 19 || April 27 || Nationals || 8–4 || Stults (1–1) || Fister (1–1) || — || 16,658 || 10–9 || W1
|- bgcolor="ffbbbb"
| 20 || April 28 || Nationals || 12–13 || Treinen (1–2) || Grilli (0–1) || Storen (5) || 14,833 || 10–10 || L1
|- bgcolor="ffbbbb"
| 21 || April 29 || Nationals || 4–13 || Zimmermann (2–2) || Wood (1–1) || — || 12,595 || 10–11 || L2
|- bgcolor="ffbbbb"
| 22 || April 30 || Reds || 1–5 || Leake (1–1) || Miller (3–1) || — || 15,744 || 10–12 || L3
|-

|- bgcolor="ccffcc"
| 23 || May 1 || Reds || 4–3 || Foltynewicz (1–0) || DeSclafani (2–2) || Grilli (8) || 30,153 || 11–12 || W1
|- bgcolor="ffbbbb"
| 24 || May 2 || Reds || 4–8 || Marquis (3–1) || Stults (1–2) || — || 29,515 || 11–13 || L1
|- bgcolor="ccffcc"
| 25 || May 3 || Reds || 5–0 || Teherán (3–1) || Cueto (2–3) || — || 30,073 || 12–13 || W1
|- bgcolor="ffbbbb"
| 26 || May 4 || Phillies || 2–5 || Harang (3–2) || Wood (1–2) || — || 17,293 || 12–14 || L1
|- bgcolor="ccffcc"
| 27 || May 5 || Phillies || 9–0 || Miller (4–1) || Billingsley (0–1) || — || 14,451 || 13–14 || W1
|- bgcolor="ccffcc"
| 28 || May 6 || Phillies || 7–5 || Foltynewicz (2–0) || Williams (2–2) || Grilli (9) || 17,772 || 14–14 || W2
|- bgcolor="ffbbbb"
| 29 || May 8 || @ Nationals || 2–9 || Gonzalez (3–2) || Stults (1–3) || — || 31,288 || 14–15 || L1
|- bgcolor="ffbbbb"
| 30 || May 9 || @ Nationals || 6–8 || Storen (1–0) || Martin (1–1) || — || 39,193 || 14–16 || L2
|- bgcolor="ffbbbb"
| 31 || May 10 || @ Nationals || 4–5 || Solis (1–0) || Martin (1–2) || Storen (9) || 31,938 || 14–17 || L3
|- bgcolor="ccffcc"
| 32 || May 11 || @ Reds || 2–1 || Avilán (1–0) || Chapman (1–2) || Johnson (2) || 19,881 || 15–17 || W1
|- bgcolor="ffbbbb"
| 33 || May 12 || @ Reds || 3–4 || Chapman (2–2) || Grilli (0–2) || — || 23,780 || 15–18 || L1
|- bgcolor="ffbbbb"
| 34 || May 13 || @ Reds || 1–5 || Iglesias (1–0) || Stults (1–4) || — || 17,747 || 15–19 || L2
|- bgcolor="ccffcc"
| 35 || May 15 || @ Marlins || 5–3 || Martin (2–2) || Dunn (0–2) || Grilli (10) || 18,334 || 16–19 || W1
|- bgcolor="ccffcc"
| 36 || May 16 || @ Marlins || 5–3 || Wood (2–2) || Latos (1–4) || Grilli (11) || 18,166 || 17–19 || W2
|- bgcolor="ccffcc"
| 37 || May 17 || @ Marlins || 6–0 || Miller (5–1) || Álvarez (0–3) || — || 23,075 || 18–19 || W3
|- bgcolor="ffbbbb"
| 38 || May 19 || Rays || 3–5 || Ramírez (2–1) || Foltynewicz (2–1) || Boxberger (11) || 20,120 || 18–20 || L1
|- bgcolor="ccffcc"
| 39 || May 20 || Rays || 2–1||  Cunniff (2–0) || Odorizzi (3–4) || Grilli (12) || 24,549 || 19–20 || W1
|- bgcolor="ccffcc"
| 40 || May 21 || Brewers || 10–1 ||  Teherán (4–1) ||  Garza (2–6) || — || 18,239 || 20–20 || W2
|- bgcolor="ffbbbb"
| 41 || May 22 || Brewers || 0–11 || Blazek (4–1) || Stults (1–5) || — || 25,774 || 20–21 || L1
|- bgcolor="ccffcc"
| 42 || May 23 || Brewers || 3–2 (11) || Avilán (2–0) || Kintzler (0–1) || — || 33,223 || 21–21 ||W1
|- bgcolor="ccffcc"
| 43 || May 24 || Brewers || 2–1 || Foltynewicz (3–1) || Nelson (2–5) || Grilli (13) || 30,612 || 22–21 || W2
|- bgcolor="ffbbbb"
| 44 || May 25 || @ Dodgers || 3–6 || Liberatore (1–1) || Masset (0–1) || Jansen (4) || 44,680 || 22–22 || L1
|- bgcolor="ffbbbb"
| 45 || May 26 || @ Dodgers || 0–8 || Kershaw (3–3) || Teherán (4–2) || — || 40,667 || 22–23 || L2
|- bgcolor="ccffcc"
| 46 || May 27 || @ Dodgers || 3–2 || Wood (3–2) || Hatcher (1–4) || Grilli (14) || 37,873 || 23–23 || W1
|- bgcolor="ffbbbb"
| 47 || May 28 || @ Giants || 0–7 || Heston (5–3) || Miller (5–2) || — || 41,040 || 23–24 || L1
|- bgcolor="ffbbbb"
| 48 || May 29 || @ Giants || 2–4 || Hudson (3–4) || Foltynewicz (3–2) || Casilla (15) || 41,311 || 23–25 || L2
|- bgcolor="ccffcc"
| 49 || May 30 || @ Giants || 8–0 || Pérez (1–0) || Lincecum (5–3) || — || 42,005 || 24–25 || W1
|- bgcolor="ccffcc"
| 50 || May 31 || @ Giants || 7–5 || Masset (1–1) || Casilla (4–1) || Grilli (15) || 41,553 || 25–25 || W2
|-

|- bgcolor="ccffcc"
| 51 || June 1 || @ D-backs || 8–1 || Wood (4–2) || Bradley (2–3) || — || 18,258 || 26–25 || W3
|- bgcolor="ffbbbb"
| 52 || June 2 || @ D-backs || 6–7 || Chafin (3–0) || Cunniff (2–1) || Ziegler (4) || 17,101 || 26–26 || L1
|- bgcolor="ffbbbb"
| 53 || June 3 || @ D-backs || 8–9 || Chafin (4–0) || Johnson (1–3) || Ziegler (5) || 17,717 || 26–27 || L2
|- bgcolor="ffbbbb"
| 54 || June 5 || Pirates || 8–10 || Morton (3–0) || Avilán (2–1) || Melancon (17) || 27,508 || 26–28 || L3
|- bgcolor="ccffcc"
| 55 || June 6 || Pirates || 5–4 || Grilli (1–2) || Worley (2–4) || — || 33,268 || 27–28 || W1
|- bgcolor="ffbbbb"
| 56 || June 7 || Pirates || 0–3 || Cole (9–2) || Wood (4–3) || Melancon (18) || 24,146 || 27–29 || L1
|- bgcolor="ffbbbb"
| 57 || June 8 || Padres || 3–5 (11) || Maurer (3–0) || Martin (2–3) || Kimbrel (14) || 21,458 || 27–30 || L2
|- bgcolor="ccffcc"
| 58 || June 9 || Padres || 6–5 || Johnson (2–3) || Benoit (4–3) || Grilli (16) || 24,049 || 28–30 || W1
|- bgcolor="ccffcc"
| 59 || June 10 || Padres || 4–1 || Pérez (2–0) || Ross (3–6) || Johnson (3) || 21,465 || 29–30 || W2
|- bgcolor="ffbbbb"
| 60 || June 11 || Padres || 4–6 (11) || Thayer (2–0) || Cunniff (2–2) || Kimbrel (15) || 21,465 || 29–31 || L1
|- bgcolor="ffbbbb"
| 61 || June 12 || @ Mets || 3–5 || Colón (9–4) || Wood (4–4) || Familia (18) || 32,554 || 29–32 || L2
|- bgcolor="ccffcc"
| 62 || June 13 || @ Mets || 5–3 (11) || Grilli (2–2) || Torres (2–3) || Pérez (1) || 37,734 || 30–32 || W1
|- bgcolor="ffbbbb"
| 63 || June 14 || @ Mets || 8–10 || Gilmartin (1–0) || Avilán (2–2) || Familia (19) || 36,340 || 30–33 || L1
|- bgcolor="ccffcc"
| 64 || June 15 || @ Red Sox || 4–2 || Pérez (3–0) || Porcello (4–7) || Grilli (17) || 34,439 || 31–33 || W1
|- bgcolor="ffbbbb"
| 65 || June 16 || @ Red Sox || 4–9 || Miley (6–6) || Teherán (4–3) || — || 35,662 || 31–34 || L1
|- bgcolor="ccffcc"
| 66 || June 17 || Red Sox || 5–2 || Masset (2–1) || Tazawa (0–3) || Grilli (18) || 28,902 || 32–34 || W1
|- bgcolor="ffbbbb"
| 67 || June 18 || Red Sox || 2–5 || Buchholz (4–6) || Miller (5–3) || Uehara (14) || 31,783 || 32–35 || L1
|- bgcolor="ccffcc"
| 68 || June 19 || Mets || 2–1 || Wisler (1–0) || deGrom (7–5) || Grilli (19) || 28,853 || 33–35 || W1
|- bgcolor="ccffcc"
| 69 || June 20 || Mets || 6–4 || Perez (4–0) || Leathersich (0–1) || Grilli (20) || 40,733 || 34-35 || W2
|- bgcolor="ccffcc"
| 70 || June 21 || Mets || 1–0 || Teherán (5–3) || Harvey (7–5) || Johnson (4) || 30,268 || 35–35 || W3
|- bgcolor="ffbbbb"
| 71 || June 23 || @ Nationals || 1–3 || Strasburg (4–5) || Wood (4–5) || Storen (21) || 28,344  || 35–36  || L1
|- bgcolor="ffbbbb"
| 72 || June 24 || @ Nationals || 1–2 (11) || Rivero (1–0) || Eveland (0–1) || — || 36,141 || 35–37 || L2
|- bgcolor="ffbbbb"
| 73 || June 25 || @ Nationals || 0–7 || Fister (3–3) || Wisler (1–1) || — || 37,874  || 35–38 || L3
|- bgcolor="ffbbbb"
| 74 || June 26 || @ Pirates || 2–3 (10) || Melancon (1–1) || Grilli (2–3) || — || 34,220 || 35–39 || L4
|- bgcolor="ffbbbb"
| 75 || June 27 || @ Pirates || 4–8 || Morton (6–1) || Teherán (5–4) || — || 36,417 || 35–40 || L5
|- bgcolor="ccffcc"
| 76 || June 28 || @ Pirates || 2–1 || Wood (5–5) || Locke (4–4) || Grilli (21) || 36,082 || 36–40 || W1
|- bgcolor="ffbbbb"
| 77 || June 30 || Nationals || 1–6 || Zimmermann (6–5) || Miller (5–4) || — || 23,961 || 36–41 || L1
|-

|- bgcolor="ccffcc"
| 78 || July 1 || Nationals || 4–1 || Wisler (2–1) || Fister (3–4) || Grilli (22) || 19,393 || 37–41 || W1
|- bgcolor="ccffcc"
| 79 || July 2 || Nationals || 2–1 || Grilli (3–3) || Scherzer (9–6) || — || 18,585 || 38–41 || W2
|- bgcolor="ccffcc"
| 80 || July 3 || Phillies || 2–1 || Teherán (6–4)  || Morgan (1–1)  || Johnson (5) || 33,090 || 39–41 || W3
|- bgcolor="ccffcc"
| 81 || July 4 || Phillies || 9–5 || Wood (6–5)  || Correia (0–3)  || — || 34,401 || 40–41 || W4
|- bgcolor="ffbbbb"
| 82 || July 5 || Phillies || 0–4 (10) || García (3–3)  || Masset (2–2)  || — || 18,763 || 40–42 || L1
|- bgcolor="ccffcc"
| 83 || July 6 || @ Brewers || 5–3 || Wisler (3–1)  || Lohse (5–10)  || Grilli (23)  || 25,046 || 41–42 || W1
|- bgcolor="ccffcc"
| 84 || July 7 || @ Brewers || 4–3 || Banuelos (1–0) || Cravy (0–2) || Grilli (24) || 33,388 || 42–42 || W2
|- bgcolor="ffbbbb"
| 85 || July 8 || @ Brewers || 5–6 || Jeffress (3–0) || Avilán (2–3) || Rodríguez (19) || 33,338 || 42–43 || L1
|- bgcolor="ffbbbb"
| 86 || July 9 || @ Rockies || 3–5 || Hale (3–4)  || Brigham (0–1)  || Axford (15) || 30,334 || 42–44 || L2
|- bgcolor="ffbbbb"
| 87 || July 10 || @ Rockies || 3–5 || Laffey (1–0)  || Miller (5–5)  || Axford (16) || 48,254 || 42–45 || L3
|- bgcolor="ffbbbb"
| 88 || July 11 || @ Rockies || 2–3 || Hawkins (2–1)  ||Grilli (3–4)  || — || 40,620 || 42–46 || L4
|- bgcolor="ffbbbb"
| 89 || July 12 || @ Rockies || 3–11 || Bettis  (5–4) ||Wood (6–6)  || — || 37,047 || 42–47 || L5
|- style="text-align:center; bgcolor="#bbbbbb"
| rowspan=3 |ASG || colspan=8 | 86th All-Star Game at Great American Ball Park in Cincinnati, Ohio, United States || rowspan=3 |Box   
|- bgcolor="bbbbbb"
| July 14 || colspan=2 | American 6, National 3 || Price (AL, DET) || Kershaw (NL, LAD) || — || 43,656 || —
|- style="text-align:center; bgcolor="bbbbbb"
| colspan=8 |Representing the Atlanta Braves: Shelby Miller
|- bgcolor="ccffcc"
| 90 || July 17 || Cubs || 4–2 || Vizcaíno (1–0) || Strop (1–5)  || Johnson (6) || 42,532 || 43–47 || W1
|- bgcolor="ffbbbb"
| 91 || July 18 || Cubs || 0–4 || Lester (5–8)  || Banuelos (1–1)  || — || 45,758 || 43–48 || L1
|- bgcolor="ffbbbb"
| 92 || July 19 || Cubs || 1–4 || Arrieta (11–5)  || Miller (5–6)  || — || 31,690 || 43–49 || L2
|- bgcolor="ccffcc"
| 93 || July 20 || Dodgers || 7–5 || Wisler (4–1)  || Liberatore (2–2) || Johnson (7)  || 24,072 || 44–49 || W1
|- bgcolor="ccffcc"
| 94 || July 21 || Dodgers || 4–3 || Wood (7–6)  || Tsao (1–1)  || Johnson (8) || 33,816  || 45–49 || W2
|- bgcolor="ffbbbb"
| 95 || July 22 || Dodgers || 1–3 || Bolsinger (5–3)  ||  Teherán (6–5)   || Jansen (17) || 24,112 || 45–50 ||  L1
|- bgcolor="ffbbbb"
| 96 || July 24 || @ Cardinals || 2–4 || Cooney (1–0)  || Banuelos (1–2)  || Siegrist (5) || 44,778  || 45–51 || L2
|- bgcolor="ffbbbb"
| 97 || July 25 || @ Cardinals || 0–1|| Martinez (11–4) || Miller (5–7)  || Choate (1)  || 45,862 || 45–52 || L3
|- bgcolor="ccffcc"
| 98 || July 26 || @ Cardinals || 3–2 || Wisler (5–1)  || Wacha (11–4)  || Johnson (9) || 44,780 || 46–52 || W1
|- bgcolor="ffbbbb"
| 99 || July 27 || @ Orioles || 1–2 (11) || Brach (4–2)  || Avilán (2–4)  || — || 26,256 || 46–53 || L1
|- bgcolor="ffbbbb"
| 100 || July 28 || @ Orioles || 3–7 || Jiménez (8–6) || Teherán (6–5) || — || 28,592 || 46–54 || L2
|- bgcolor="ffbbbb"
| 101 || July 29 || @ Orioles || 0–2 || Tillman (8–7) ||  Foltynewicz (3–3)  || Britton (26) || 29,238 || 46–55 || L3
|- bgcolor="ffbbbb"
| 102 || July 30 || @ Phillies || 1–4 || Harang (5–11) || Miller (5–8) || Giles (2) || 21,706 || 46–56 || L4
|- bgcolor="ffbbbb"
| 103 || July 31 || @ Phillies || 3–9 || Buchanan (2–5) ||  Perez (4–1) || — || 29,290 || 46–57 || L5
|-

|- bgcolor="ffbbbb"
| 104 || August 1 || @ Phillies || 2–12 || Nola (2–1) || Wisler (5–2) || — || 25,523 || 46–58 || L6
|- bgcolor="ccffcc"
| 105 || August 2 || @ Phillies || 6–2 || Teherán (7–6) || Morgan (2–3) || — || 24,361 || 47–58 || W1
|- bgcolor="ccffcc"
| 106 || August 3 || Giants || 9–8 (12) || Vizcaíno (2–0) || Vogelsong (7–7) || — || 23,428 || 48–58 || W2
|- bgcolor="ffbbbb"
| 107 || August 4 || Giants || 3–8 || Affeldt (1–2) || Aardsma (0–1) || — || 18,411 || 48–59 || L1
|- bgcolor="ffbbbb"
| 108 || August 5 || Giants || 1–6 || Bumgarner (12–6) ||  Perez (4–2) || — || 17,444 || 48–60 || L2
|- bgcolor="ccffcc"
| 109 || August 6 || Marlins || 9–8 || McKirahan (10) || Morris (33) || Vizcaíno (1) || 18,548 || 49–60 || W1
|- bgcolor="ccffcc"
| 110 || August 7 || Marlins || 6–3 || Detwiler (1–5) || Flores (0–1) || Vizcaíno (2) || 22,769 || 50–60 || W2
|- bgcolor="ccffcc"
| 111 || August 8 || Marlins || 7–2 || Foltynewicz (4–3) ||  Koehler (89) || — || 42,544 || 51–60 || W3
|- bgcolor="ffbbbb"
| 112 || August 9 || Marlins || 1–4 || Hand (2–2) || Miller (5–9) || Ramos (18) || 24,610 || 51–61 || L1
|- bgcolor="ffbbbb"
| 113 || August 11 || @ Rays || 0–2 || Ramírez (9–4) || Perez (4–2) || Cedeño (1) || 15,506 || 51–62 || L2
|- bgcolor="ffbbbb"
| 114 || August 12 || @ Rays || 6–9 || Colomé (5–4) || Marksberry (0–1) || Boxberger (29) || 16,337 || 51–63 || L3
|- bgcolor="ccffcc"
| 115 || August 14 || D-backs || 3–2 || Teherán (8–6) || Ray (3–8) || Vizcaíno (3) || 31,917 || 52–63 || W1
|- bgcolor="ffbbbb"
| 116 || August 15 || D-backs || 4–8 || Corbin (3–3) || Foltynewicz (4–4) || — || 29,624 || 52–64 || L1
|- bgcolor="ccffcc"
| 117 || August 16 || D-backs || 2–1 (10) || Aardsma (1–1) || Hernandez (0–3) || — || 20,840 || 53–64 || W1
|- bgcolor="ffbbbb"
| 118 || August 17 || @ Padres || 3–5 || Rea (2–0) || Perez (4–4) || Kimbrel (34) || 23,716 || 53–65 || L1
|- bgcolor="ffbbbb"
| 119 || August 18 || @ Padres || 0–9 || Shields (9–5) || Wisler (5–3) || — || 28,395 || 53–66 || L2
|- bgcolor="ffbbbb"
| 120 || August 19 || @ Padres || 2–3 || Kelley (2–2) || Marksberry (0–2) || Kimbrel (35) || 20,732 || 53–67 || L3
|- bgcolor="ffbbbb"
| 121 || August 20 || @ Cubs || 1–7 || Arrieta (15–6) || Foltynewicz (4–5) || — || 34,633 || 53–68 || L4
|- bgcolor="ffbbbb"
| 122 || August 21 || @ Cubs || 3–5 || Motte (8–1) || Miller (5–10) || Rondón (22) || 39,211 || 53–69 || L5
|- bgcolor="ffbbbb"
| 123 || August 22 || @ Cubs || 7–9 || Strop (2–6) || Jackson (2–2) || Rondón (23) || 41,196 || 53–70 || L6
|- bgcolor="ffbbbb"
| 124 || August 23 || @ Cubs || 3–9 || Hammel (7–5) || Wisler (5–4) || — || 39,581 || 53–71 || L7
|- bgcolor="ccffcc"
| 125 || August 24 || Rockies || 5–3 || Teherán (9–6) || de la Rosa (7–6) || Vizcaíno (4) || 13,920 || 54–71 || W1
|- bgcolor="ffbbbb"
| 126 || August 25 || Rockies || 1–5 || Bettis (6–4) || Foltynewicz (4–6) || — || 13,863 || 54–72 || L1
|- bgcolor="ffbbbb"
| 127 || August 26 || Rockies || 3–6 || Castro (1–0) || Miller (5–11) || Axford (18) || 18,328 || 54–73 || L2
|- bgcolor="ffbbbb"
| 128 || August 28 || Yankees || 4–15 || Tanaka (10–6) || Perez (4–5) || — || 35,546 || 54–74 || L3
|- bgcolor="ffbbbb"
| 129 || August 29 || Yankees || 1–3 || Severino (2–2) || Wisler (5–5) || Miller (28) || 49,243 || 54–75 || L4
|- bgcolor="ffbbbb"
| 130 || August 30 || Yankees || 6–20 || Eovaldi (14–2) || Teherán (9–6) || — || 33,093 || 54–76 || L5
|- bgcolor="ffbbbb"
| 131 || August 31 || Marlins || 0–4 || Narveson (2–1) || Miller (5–12) || — || 12,916 || 54–77 || L6
|-

|- bgcolor="ffbbbb"
| 132 || September 1 || Marlins || 1–7 || Nicolino (3–2) || Banuelos (1–3) || — || 16,386 || 54–78 || L7
|- bgcolor="ffbbbb"
| 133 || September 2 || Marlins || 3–7 || Conley (3–1) || Perez (4–6) || — || 17,949 || 54–79 || L8
|- bgcolor="ffbbbb"
| 134 || September 3 || @ Nationals || 1–15 || Zimmermann (12–8) || Wisler (5–6) || — || 28,627 || 54–80 || L9
|- bgcolor="ffbbbb"
| 135 || September 4 || @ Nationals || 2–5 (10) || Papelbon (3–1) || Marksberry (0–3) || — || 23,536 || 54–81 || L10
|- bgcolor="ffbbbb"
| 136 || September 5 || @ Nationals || 2–8 || Gonzalez (10–7) || Miller (5–13) || — || 28,646 || 54–82 || L11
|- bgcolor="ffbbbb"
| 137 || September 6 || @ Nationals || 4–8 || Rivero (2–1) || Banuelos (1–4) || — || 29,281 || 54–83 || L12
|- bgcolor="ccffcc"
| 138 || September 7 || @ Phillies || 7–2 || Perez (5–6) || Harang (5–15) || — || 15,125 || 55–83 || W1
|- bgcolor="ffbbbb"
| 139 || September 8 || @ Phillies || 0–5 || Nola (6–2) || Weber (0–1) || Giles (12) || 15,610 || 55–84 || L1
|- bgcolor="ccffcc"
| 140 || September 9 || @ Phillies || 8–1 || Teherán (10–6) || Buchanan (2–8) || — || 15,241 || 56–84 || W1
|- bgcolor="ffbbbb"
| 141 || September 10 || Mets || 2–7 || Colón (2–0) || Miller (5–14) || — || 22,640 || 56–85 || L1
|- bgcolor="ffbbbb"
| 142 || September 11 || Mets || 1–5 || Matz (3–0) || Wisler (5–7) || — || 23,216 || 56–86 || L2
|- bgcolor="ffbbbb"
| 143 || September 12 || Mets || 4–6 || Clippard (4–4) || Vizcaíno (2–1) ||  Familia (40) || 27,380 || 56–87 || L3
|- bgcolor="ffbbbb"
| 144 || September 13 || Mets || 7–10 (10) || Parnell (2–3) || Jackson (2–3) || Reed (4) || 23,786 || 56–88 || L4
|- bgcolor="ccffcc"
| 145 || September 15 || Blue Jays || 3–2 || Vizcaíno (3–1) || Sanchez (7–6) || — || 16,399 || 57–88 || W1
|- bgcolor="ffbbbb"
| 146 || September 16 || Blue Jays || 1–9 || Price (16–5) || Miller (5–15) || — || 15,178 || 57–89 || L1
|- bgcolor="ffbbbb"
| 147 || September 17 || Blue Jays || 0–5 || Estrada (13–8) || Wisler (5–8) || — || 19,367 || 57–90 || L2
|- bgcolor="ccffcc"
| 148 || September 18 || Phillies || 2–1 || Perez (6–6) || Morgan (5–7) || Vizcaíno (5) || 22,525 || 58–90 || W1
|- bgcolor="ccffcc"
| 149 || September 19 || Phillies || 2–1 || Jackson (3–3) || Williams (4–11) || Vizcaíno (6) || 24,855 || 59–90 || W2
|- bgcolor="ccffcc"
| 150 || September 20 || Phillies || 2–1 || Moylan (1–0) || García (3–6) || — || 23,723 || 60–90 || W3
|- bgcolor="ffbbbb"
| 151 || September 21 || @ Mets || 0–4 || Niese (9–10) || Miller (5–16) || — || 26,362 || 60–91 || L1
|- bgcolor="ccffcc"
| 152 || September 22 || @ Mets || 6–2 || Wisler (6–8) || Verrett (1–2) || — || 26,227 || 61–91 || W1
|- bgcolor="ccffcc"
| 153 || September 23 || @ Mets || 6–3 || Jackson (4–3) || Familia (2–2) || Vizcaíno (7) || 28,931 || 62–91 || W2
|- bgcolor="ffbbbb"
| 154 || September 25 || @ Marlins || 11–12 || Fernández (6–0) || Weber (0–1) || Ramos (30) || 24,626 || 62–92 || L1
|- bgcolor="ffbbbb"
| 155 || September 26 || @ Marlins || 2–6 || Nicolino (4–4) || Teherán (10–9) || — || 24,449 || 62–93 || L2
|- bgcolor="ffbbbb"
| 156 || September 27 || @ Marlins || 5–9 || Koehler (11–14) ||  Miller (5–16) || — || 27,702 || 62–94 || L3
|- bgcolor="ccffcc"
| 157 || September 29 || Nationals || 2–1 || Wisler (7–8) || Roark (4–7) || Vizcaíno (8) || 15,272 || 63–94 || W1
|- bgcolor="ccffcc"
| 158 || September 30 || Nationals || 2–0 || Pérez (7–6) || Zimmermann (13–10) || Vizcaíno (9) || 13,860 || 64–94 || W2
|-

|- bgcolor="ffbbbb"
| 159 || October 1 || Nationals || 0–3 || Strasburg (11–7) || Weber (0–3) || Rivero (1) || 37,790 || 64–95 || L1
|- bgcolor=ccffcc
| 160 || October 2 || Cardinals || 4–0 || Teherán (11–8) || García (10–6) || — || 24,481 || 65–95 || W1
|- bgcolor=cccccc
| || October 3 || Cardinals || colspan=4| Postponed (rain); rescheduled for October 4 || || ||
|- bgcolor=ccfcc
| 161 || October 4 || Cardinals || 6–0 || Miller (6–17) || Lackey (13–10) || — ||  || 66–95 || W2
|- bgcolor=ccfcc
| 162 || October 4 || Cardinals || 2–0 || Wisler (8–8) || Lynn (12–11) || Jackson (1) || 31,441 || 67–95 || W3
|-

|-
| Legend:       = Win       = Loss       = PostponementBold = Braves team member

Roster

Farm system

References

External links

2015 Atlanta Braves season at Baseball Reference
2015 Atlanta Braves season Official Site

Atlanta Braves seasons
Atlanta Braves
2015 in sports in Georgia (U.S. state)